The 1997 Waterford Senior Hurling Championship was the 97th staging of the Waterford Senior Hurling Championship since its establishment by the Waterford County Board in 1897.

Ballygunner were the defending champions.

On 19 October 1997, Ballygunner won the championship after a 2-17 to 1-14 defeat of Passage in the final. This was their 7th championship title overall and their third title in succession.

References

Waterford Senior Hurling Championship
Waterford Senior Hurling Championship